Alfyorovo is a rural locality (a village) in Posyolok Dobryatino, Gus-Khrustalny District, Vladimir Oblast, Russia. The population was 129 as of 2010. There are 5 streets.

Geography 
Alfyorovo is located 54 km southeast of Gus-Khrustalny (the district's administrative centre) by road. Ilyino is the nearest rural locality.

References 

Rural localities in Gus-Khrustalny District
Melenkovsky Uyezd